University Credit Union began as the Boston University Employees' Credit Union, which was founded by a group of Boston University employees May, 1952.  It began with 9 volunteers serving on the Credit Union's first Board of Directors.  Early Board meetings covered matters ranging from the Credit Union's finances and operational issues to sending greetings and wishes to a Credit Union member in the hospital.

It has since merged with Metro Credit Union.

Today
Since the beginning, Boston University Employees' Credit Union grew from serving the employees of Boston University to serving educational and healthcare institutions and changing its name to University Credit Union.  Membership has reached over 10,500 and continues to climb.

University Credit Union has relationships with the following institutions:
 Bentley University
 Berklee College of Music
 Boston College
 Boston College of Architecture
 Boston Medical Center
 Boston University
 Children's Services of Roxbury
 Crittenton
 Education Development Center
 Emerson College
 Fisher College
 Lesley University
 Mental Health Programs
 Morgan Memorial Goodwill Industries
 Massachusetts Society for the Prevention of Cruelty to Animals-Angell Animal Medical Center
 New England School of Acupuncture
 New England School of Law
 Newbury College
 Perkins School for the Blind
 Planned Parenthood League of MA
 Roxbury Comprehensive Community Healthcare
 Suffolk University
 Tufts University
 Victory Human Services
 Vinfen

University Credit Union is located at 846 Commonwealth Ave. and 710 Albany Street in Boston, Massachusetts.

External links
 official site

1952 establishments in Massachusetts
Credit unions based in Massachusetts
Boston University